The Greatest Indian was a poll sponsored by Reliance Mobile and conducted by Outlook magazine, in partnership with CNN-IBN and The History Channel. The poll was conducted from June to August 2012, with the winner, B. R. Ambedkar, announced on 11 August. A program associated with the poll aired from 4 June until 15 August.

Unlike other editions of Greatest Britons spin-offs, The Greatest Indian did not include people from all time periods of history. Two reasons were given for this choice. The first was that "the pre-independence history of India is dominated by Mahatma Gandhi and it is impossible for anyone to come close to the Father of the Nation when it comes to Leadership, Impact and Contribution. [...] The panel of experts felt that if Gandhi were to be included in the list, there would be no competition for title of The Greatest Indian". Secondly, The Greatest Indian chose to focus on India as a modern nation: "India today is unrecognizable from the India that got independence in 1947. This nation has achieved this stature in the world thanks to contribution from millions of Indians. This is an effort to recognise one who has made the maximum contribution and impact in the surge of independent India".

Nominations and voting process
A list of 100 names was presented to and compiled by a 28-member jury composed of actors, writers, sportspersons, entrepreneurs, and men and women of distinction in their fields. This jury included N. Ram (former Editor-In-Chief of The Hindu), Vinod Mehta (Editor-in-Chief of Outlook), Soli Sorabjee (Former Attorney General of India), Sharmila Tagore (Bollywood actress and former Chairperson of the Censor Board of India), Harsha Bhogle (sports), Chetan Bhagat (author), Ramachandra Guha (historian), Shashi Tharoor (politician and author), Nandan Nilekani, Rajkumar Hirani, Shabana Azmi and Arun Jaitley. They finalized a list of the top 50 nominees, which was released to the public on 4 June 2012, by CNN-IBN Editor-in-Chief Rajdeep Sardesai. A three-way process was then used to assess a top ten, in which equal weight was given to the votes of the jury, an online poll, and a market survey conducted by the Nielsen Company. 7,129,050 people participated in this phase of the online poll. Public voting was conducted from 4 to 25 June, with the final top ten were announced on 3 July. A second round of voting followed, using the same method as the first, lasting from 1 July to 1 August. Individuals were able to cast votes either by visiting www.thegreatestindian.in or by calling a unique number given to each of the nominees. Nearly 20,000,000 people voted in this round of the survey. The announcement of the winner was made on 11 August, with a special finale, hosted by Amitabh Bachchan and featuring other Indian celebrities, airing on 14 and 15 August (Independence Day).

Top ten nominees 
The top 10 nominees have all received the Bharat Ratna, the highest civilian award of the Republic of India.

List of original fifty nominees
Of 50 nominees, 15 have received the Bharat Ratna and 6 are women. The oldest living nominees at the time of the poll were Ravi Shankar (92), M. S. Swaminathan (87) and Atal Bihari Vajpayee (88), while Sachin Tendulkar (39) was the youngest.

 Dr. B. R. Ambedkar (1891–1956) 
 A. P. J. Abdul Kalam (1931–2015)
 Vallabhbhai Patel (1875–1950)
 Jawaharlal Nehru (1889–1964)
 Mother Teresa (1910–1997)
 J. R. D. Tata (1904–1993)
 Indira Gandhi (1917–1984)
 Sachin Tendulkar (b. 1973)
 Atal Bihari Vajpayee (1924–2018)
 Lata Mangeshkar (1929–2022)
 Jayaprakash Narayan (1902–1979) social reformer
 Kanshi Ram (1934–2006) politician and Founder of the BSP
 Ram Manohar Lohia (1910–1967) Socialist leader
 C. Rajagopalachari (1878–1972) First Indian Governor-General of India
 Sam Manekshaw (1914–2008) Chief of the Army Staff of the Indian Army
 Baba Amte (1914–2008) social worker
 Ela Bhatt (1933-2022) founder Self-Employed Women's Association of India
 Vinoba Bhave (1895–1982) advocate of nonviolence
 Kamaladevi Chattopadhyay (1903–1988) freedom fighter
 Ravi Shankar (1920–2012) musician
 M. S. Subbulakshmi (1916–2004) Carnatic vocalist
 M. F. Husain (1915–2011) painter
 Bismillah Khan (1916–2006) musician
 R. K. Narayan (1906–2001) writer
 R. K. Laxman (1921–2015) cartoonist, illustrator, and humorist
 B. K. S. Iyengar (1918–2014) founder of Iyengar Yoga
 Amitabh Bachchan (b. 1942) film actor
 Raj Kapoor (1924–1988) director of Hindi cinema
 Kamal Hasan (b. 1954) actor, director
 Satyajit Ray (1921–1992) filmmaker
 A. R. Rahman (b. 1967) composer and philanthropist
 Kishore Kumar (1929–1987) film playback singer
 Dilip Kumar (1922–2021) actor, producer and activist
 Dev Anand (1923–2011) producer and actor
 Mohammad Rafi (1924–1980) singer
 Homi Bhabha (1909–1966) nuclear physicist
 Dhirubhai Ambani (1932–2002) business tycoon, founder of Reliance Industries
 Verghese Kurien (1921–2012) social entrepreneur
 Ghanshyam Das Birla (1894–1983) businessman
 N. R. Narayana Murthy (b. 1946) IT industrialist
 Vikram Sarabhai (1919–1971) scientist
 M. S. Swaminathan (b. 1925) geneticist
 Ramnath Goenka (1904–1991) newspaper publisher
 Amartya Sen (b. 1933) philosopher and economist
 E. Sreedharan (b. 1932) civil engineer
 Kapil Dev (b. 1959) cricketer
 Sunil Gavaskar (b. 1949) cricketer
 Dhyan Chand (1905–1979) hockey player
 Viswanathan Anand (b. 1969) chess Grandmaster
 Milkha Singh (1929–2021) sprinter

Results
Babasaheb Ambedkar was generally approved of as the greatest Indian, with several prominent scholars writing articles congratulating him, including Ramachandra Guha and S. Anand.

See also
Greatest Bengali of all time
Greatest Britons spin-offs
100 Greatest Britons

References

Sources

External links
 A Measure Of The Man

2012 Indian television series debuts
2012 Indian television series endings
Indian documentary television series
Indian
History (American TV channel) original programming
Lists of Indian people
Indian television series based on British television series
Cultural depictions of B. R. Ambedkar
Recipients of the Bharat Ratna